"Iron Man" is a song by English heavy metal band Black Sabbath, released in 1970 from the band's second studio album, Paranoid.

Composition

Upon hearing Tony Iommi's main guitar riff at rehearsal for the first time, vocalist Ozzy Osbourne remarked that it sounded "like a big iron bloke walking about", with "Iron Bloke" becoming the placeholder title for a short time as the band worked out the song. As the song developed and Butler composed the lyrics, the title evolved to "Iron Man".

The lyrics, composed by bassist and lyricist Geezer Butler, tell the story of a man who travels into the future and sees the apocalypse. In the process of returning to the present to warn the human race, he is turned into steel by a magnetic field and his attempts to warn the public are ignored and mocked. Feeling shunned and alone, Iron Man plans his revenge on mankind, causing the apocalypse seen in his vision. Butler recalled, "I liked the Hammer horror films in the 1960s and magazines such as Man, Myth and Magic, but I had a few supernatural experiences as a child and dreams that came true and that, more than anything, shaped my interest in the occult". Butler added, "What I always attempted to do with my science-fiction plots was to make these relevant to the modern world at the time, so I brought war and politics in. It was also an era when the whole issue of pollution was starting to get attention, and this affected my thinking quite a bit." 

How the distorted vocals at the beginning that say "I am Iron Man" were created has been a topic of debate. It has been rumored that Osbourne sang through an oscillating metal fan to get the sound, but it's more likely that his voice was run through a processor called a ring modulator, which creates a wobbly electronic effect by mixing the input signal with an oscillator. This is the device used to create the voices of the Daleks on Doctor Who, and it is something Iommi used on his guitar solo in "Paranoid". Despite the title and its use in the 2008 movie, the song has no connection to the Marvel Comics character of the same name.

Reception and legacy
The song peaked at number 52 on the Billboard Hot 100 in 1972, becoming their highest-charting single on the chart. It also reached number 68 on the Canadian RPM Magazine Top 100. The live rendition of the song from Reunion won the 2000 Grammy Award for Best Metal Performance.

"Iron Man" was used in the end credits of the 2008 movie Iron Man, as well in its video game adaptation and the trailer for the 2010 sequel, Iron Man 2. The character Tony Stark, alter-ego of Iron Man, also wears a Black Sabbath t-shirt in the 2012 film The Avengers. The song won spot number 317 in Rolling Stone's list of the 500 Greatest Songs of All Time as of 2004. "Iron Man" was ranked the sixth best Black Sabbath song by Rock – Das Gesamtwerk der größten Rock-Acts im Check. VH1 ranked the song as the greatest heavy metal song of all time.

Personnel
Ozzy Osbourne – vocals
Tony Iommi – guitars
Geezer Butler – bass
Bill Ward – drums

Certifications

See also
 Self-fulfilling prophecy
 Ontological paradox

References

1970 songs
1971 singles
Black Sabbath songs
Songs about time travel
Songs written by Ozzy Osbourne
Songs written by Tony Iommi
Songs written by Geezer Butler
Songs written by Bill Ward (musician)
Grammy Award for Best Metal Performance
Warner Records singles